Tyler Eugene Carpenter (born January 3, 1991) is an American professional stock car racing and dirt track racing driver. He competes part-time in the NASCAR Craftsman Truck Series, driving the No. 41 Chevrolet Silverado for Niece Motorsports and full-time in Dirt Super Late Model’s driving the No. 28 Kryptonite Racecars Chassis for Kryptonite Racecars.

Racing career

Dirt late models
In 2019, Carpenter would win the 2019 Gateway Dirt Nationals.

In 2021, Carpenter would race in the 2021 Gateway Dirt Nationals. After moving through the preliminary heats, Carpenter would complete a flag-to-flag performance to win the event. However, some drivers, most notably fellow drivers Ricky Thornton Jr. and Brandon Sheppard would criticize Carpenter for his driving style, saying that Carpenter had little respect for others on track. In response, Carpenter said "It’s either make the move or be moved. I don’t want to crash them guys. Hell, I like ‘em all. We’re here to race… they’ve had their opportunity to win big races. This is the only shot I got as of right now. I ain’t got the backing they got."

NASCAR Craftsman Truck Series
As a result of winning the 2021 Gateway Dirt Nationals, Carpenter is currently scheduled to race a one-off race for Niece Motorsports at Knoxville Raceway as part of the team's "Win and You're In" program.

Personal life
Carpenter is a Parkersburg, West Virginia native. According to Carpenter, his father, "Fast" Freddie, is reported to have sparked his interest in racing, saying "Growing up as a kid, I watched him and one thing [eventually] led to another. He got his boys involved which [included] me and my brother."

Motorsports career results

NASCAR
(key) (Bold – Pole position awarded by qualifying time. Italics – Pole position earned by points standings or practice time. * – Most laps led.)

Craftsman Truck Series

 Season in progress
 Ineligible for series points

References

External links
 

1991 births
Living people
NASCAR drivers
Racing drivers from West Virginia
People from Parkersburg, West Virginia
Sportspeople from Parkersburg, West Virginia